Razjerd (also known as Vazjerd) is a village in Eqbal-e Sharqi Rural District, in the Central District of Qazvin County, Qazvin Province, Iran. At the 2006 census, its population was 1,844, in 517 families.

Distance of the village is located 21 kilometers from Qazvin.
Regional climate and weather is around Qazvin.
People from Qazvin on holidays to travel there.

References

External links 

 Zeziyard

Populated places in Qazvin County